Georgios Salamastrakis (born 21 December 1981) is a Greek footballer. He currently plays for Panachaiki F.C. as a centre back.

Career
Born in Rhodes, Salamastrakis began his career with local club Rodos.

In 2005, he joined Diagoras. Georgios made his debut on 25 September 2005, in a 1–0 away win over Apollon Smyrni. On 10 September 2006, he scored his first Diagoras goal as he netted the first in a 3–1 away win over Agios Dimitrios on the opening day of the 2006–07 season. Salamastrakis scored 11 goals in 138 league matches for Diagoras, before moved to Panserraikos in 2011.

On 27 June 2012, Salamastrakis joined Bulgarian side Lokomotiv Plovdiv. He earned 3 competitive appearances. In early August his contract was terminated by mutual consent.

References

External links
Salamastrakis career statistics at myplayer.gr

1981 births
Living people
Greek footballers
Greek expatriate footballers
Diagoras F.C. players
Panserraikos F.C. players
PFC Lokomotiv Plovdiv players
Expatriate footballers in Bulgaria
Association football defenders
People from Rhodes
Sportspeople from the South Aegean